Solar power in Azerbaijan includes individual and commercial scale systems. Due to its climatic conditions and locations Azerbaijan has greater potential for solar power than the rest of the region. Insolation values are higher and other conditions for solar power generation are comparable to neighboring countries in the South Caucasus. The country features 250 sunny days per annum: changing from 2210 to 2700 hours and from 865 to 1000 hours in summer and winter periods, respectively.

Insolation 
Annual solar radiation reaches 4.7 kWh/ m2/day and approximately 5000–6500 MJ/m2/year. The highest insolation areas are on the Absheron peninsula and Nakhchivan region. Solar radiation ranges from 1900 to 2800 in different regions such as high-mountain zones of the Great and Small Caucasus. Absheron Peninsula receives almost 1600 kWh/m2 per year of solar radiation.

Three locations of intensive solar radiation in Azerbaijan: Pirallahi-Island, Minguechaur and Nakhichivan.

Policies 
Existing legislation on renewable energy:

 On the use of energy resources (1996);
 About Electric Energy (1998);
 About Energy (1998);
 About Electric and heat power plants (1999);

Incentives 

 The State Program on Use of Alternative and Renewable Energy Sources in Azerbaijan Republic (2004).
 Order of the President "On the development of the State Strategy on use of alternative and renewable energy sources in the Republic of Azerbaijan for 20122020”;
 Presidential Decree on approval of “AZERBAIJAN 2020: LOOK INTO THE FUTURE” DEVELOPMENT CONCEPT.
 Presidential Order No. 964 covering the state program for the development of industry in Azerbaijan in 2015–2020 was approved by dated December 26, 2014
 Presidential Decree on Strategic Road Map for the development of utilities (electricity and thermal energy, water and gas supply) March 16, 2016 no. 1897).

Solar power plants 

 Pirallahy Solar Power Plant. Installed capacity: 2.8 MW.
 Surakhany Solar Power Plant. Installed capacity: 2.8 MW
 Sumgayıt SPP. Installed capacity: 2.8 MW
 Nakhchivan Solar Power Plant – 20 MW. The 20 megawatts plant is a project implemented under an agreement between the State Energy Agency of Nakhchivan Autonomous Republic and Belgian Soltech Company. Some 78,684 modern glass solar panels, stands and 11 electric power substations were installed there. The Solar Power Plant produces more than 30 million kilowatt-hours of electricity per year.

See also 
 Natural Resources of Azerbaijan
 Energy in Azerbaijan

References

External links 

Economy of Azerbaijan
Azerbaijan